Xystophora defixa is a moth of the family Gelechiidae. It was described by Edward Meyrick in 1929. It is found in southern India.

The wingspan is about 13 mm. The forewings are ochreous grey whitish with a small spot of dark grey sprinkles on the base of the costa. The stigmata are dark fuscous, the discal moderately large, the plical small, rather obliquely before the first discal. There is some slight greyish suffusion on the tornus and on the costa opposite. The hindwings are grey.

References

Moths described in 1929
Xystophora